Howard Sylvester Ellis (July 2, 1898 – April 15, 1992) was an American economist. He was a professor of economics at the University of California, Berkeley from 1938 to 1965. In 1949, he served as president of the American Economic Association.

He is remembered for his essay 'Bilateralism and the Future of International Trade' (Summer 1945) which influenced United States trade policy after World War II.

References

External links 
 

1898 births
1992 deaths
People from Denver
Economists from Colorado
University of Iowa alumni
University of Michigan alumni
Harvard University alumni
University of California, Berkeley College of Letters and Science faculty
Presidents of the American Economic Association
20th-century American economists